State Route 126 (SR 126) is a state route starting at the Ohio-Indiana border, at a split with State Route 129 near Scipio, Ohio, and ending east of Cincinnati at an intersection with U.S. Route 50 in Milford. State Route 126 is locally known for comprising most of Ronald Reagan Cross County Highway.

History

Prior to the completion of Ronald Reagan Cross County Highway in 1997, the central portion of State Route 126 between Ross and Montgomery consisted of West Kemper Road, Springfield Pike (State Route 4), Glendale Milford Road, Kenwood Road, and Cooper Road. On October 28, 1997, the Ohio Department of Transportation (ODOT) took over Ronald Reagan Highway, except for the segment west of Colerain Avenue. State Route 126 was rerouted over the highway, while Kemper, Glendale Milford, Kenwood, and Cooper roads were returned to local authorities.

Major junctions

References

External links

Ronald Reagan Cross County Highway at Cincinnati-Transit.net
Indiana Highway Ends: Indiana SR 252 (with western terminus of Ohio SR 126)
Highways of the State of Ohio: Ohio State Route 126, Hamilton County, Bill Burmaster

Reagan, Ronald
126
Transportation in Butler County, Ohio
Transportation in Hamilton County, Ohio
Transportation in Clermont County, Ohio
Roads in Cincinnati